Belle Goshorn MacCorkle (1841 – September 12, 1923) was the wife of former Governor of West Virginia William A. MacCorkle and served as that state's First Lady, 1893–1897.  She was born in 1841, at Charleston, West Virginia. In 1884, she married William A. MacCorkle.  The MacCorkles were the first to reside in the state supplied Governor's Mansion.  She died at the MacCorkle home Sunrise on September 12, 1923.

References

1841 births
1923 deaths
People from Charleston, West Virginia
First Ladies and Gentlemen of West Virginia